Posyolok imeni Zhelyabova is a rural locality (a settlement) and the administrative center of Posyolok imeni Zhelyabovo, Ustyuzhensky District, Vologda Oblast, Russia. The population was 33 as of 2002. There are 19 streets.

Geography 
Lentyevo is the nearest rural locality.

References 

Rural localities in Ustyuzhensky District